Orason is a census-designated place (CDP) in Cameron County, in the U.S. state of Texas. The population was 129 at the 2010 census. Prior to the 2010 census the community was part of the Chula Vista-Orason CDP. It is part of the Brownsville–Harlingen Metropolitan Statistical Area.

Geography
It is bordered on the east by Chula Vista.

References

Census-designated places in Cameron County, Texas
Census-designated places in Texas